The Kehelgamu Oya (translated into Kehelgamu River from Sinhala) is a major upstream tributary of the Kelani River. The tributary measures  in length, originating from the hills of the Horton Plains National Park, before passing through the Castlereigh Reservoir. The river is heavily used for hydroelectric power generation.

Features on the river 
The following table lists the features along the Kehelgamu Oya, from its origins further upstream. Some dams hold back water, and transfer a percentage of it to hydroelectric power stations located further downstream, via tunnels.

See also 

 List of dams and reservoirs in Sri Lanka
 List of rivers of Sri Lanka

References 

Rivers of Sri Lanka